Chelsea Does is an American streaming television documentary series first released on Netflix on January 23, 2016. The episodes follow comedian Chelsea Handler as she explores different subjects. Most of the episodes include discussions between Handler and her friends (often fellow comedians), family, and psychologists about the topic at hand. Handler also travels for the show visiting destinations relevant to the topic.

Episodes

Season 1 (2016)

References
 3. Review By Robert Lloyd - LA TIMES - https://www.latimes.com/entertainment/tv/la-et-st-netflix-chelsea-does-review-20160122-story.html

External links

Chelsea Does ranked as Top 5 New Netflix Originals for 2016

English-language Netflix original programming
2016 American television series debuts
2016 American television series endings
2010s American mockumentary television series